The Agricultural Children Act 1873 (36 & 37 Vict c 67) was an Act of the Parliament of the United Kingdom, which prohibited the agricultural employment of children under the age of eight  and also provided for the education of children involved in farm labour. As part of this, the Act stated that children could not be employed in agricultural work without parental confirmation that they had attended school a certain number of times in the preceding twelve months, specifically 250 times for children aged eight to ten and 150 times for individuals over the age of ten. Ultimately, the Act was ineffective, and its provisions were replaced by those of the Elementary Education Act 1876 and the Elementary Education Act 1880.

See also 
Agricultural Gangs Act 1867

References
Chambers, George Frederick. The Agricultural Children Act, 1873, and the Agricultural Gangs Act, 1867. Knight & Co. Fleet Street, London. 1873. Scan at the Internet Archive.
Owen, Hugh. "Agricultural Children Act, 1873". The Elementary Education Acts, 1870, 1873, 1874, and Agricultural Children Act, 1873. Tenth Edition. Knight & Co. Fleet Street, London. 1875. Page 228 et seq.

United Kingdom Acts of Parliament 1873
Agriculture legislation in the United Kingdom
United Kingdom Education Acts
Education policy in the United Kingdom